Peter Michael Tuchman (born 1957 or 1958) is a stock trader on the floor of the New York Stock Exchange (NYSE). He has been called the "most photographed trader on Wall Street".

Early life 
Tuchman grew up on the Upper West Side of New York City with his older brother Jeffrey Tuchman. He was born in 1957 or 1958 to a Jewish family. His mother, Shoshana Itzkovich, was born in Hungary. His father, Marcel Tuchman, was born in Poland in 1921. Tuchman's parents were Holocaust survivors who met in a displaced persons camp after World War II. They immigrated to the United States in 1949.

Tuchman's father was a doctor who practiced medicine from 1950 until 2018. After the war, he and thirty survivors applied to Heidelberg University medical school. He was part of the first group of Jewish students allowed into a German medical school in post-Nazi Germany. He stayed in Germany until 1949 to finish his degree then moved to the United States for residency and an internship at Bellevue Hospital.

Education and professional career 
Tuchman graduated from the University of Massachusetts where he studied economics and agriculture.

Through a patient of his father's who ran a brokerage, Tuchman got a summer job starting on May 23, 1985 as a teletypist on the floor of the NYSE. He has been on the floor of the NYSE ever since. In 2011, Tuchman joined Quattro Securities.

Tuchman's largest trade was 10 million shares. He says that on any given day, he may trade a couple of hundred million dollars of stock.

Tuchman is not a fan of electronic trading. He told BuzzFeed News that "we did not become more productive, there is nothing productive about the new technology, in my opinion. There was a lot more communication, transparency, a lot more volume back then."

Recognition 
Tuchman's photo is widely recognized for its affiliation to market news. Tuchman has strong, emotional expressions of anguish, anticipation, desperation, and triumph which he says are genuine. His photo is often chosen for news about Wall Street particularly on days of market volatility. Some say that he resembles Albert Einstein and that this is what makes his photo intriguing.

Tuchman has been called:

 "Most photographed trader on Wall Street"
 "Most famous stock trader on Wall Street"
 "NYSE's most iconic stockbroker"
 "The most photographed person at the NYSE"
 "Wall Street's most photographed broker"
 "Most recognizable broker on the floor of the New York Stock Exchange"

Personal life 
Tuchman is married to Lise Zumwalt Tuchman, a filmmaker and producer. They have two children, Benjamin and Lucy.

His brother, Jeffrey Tuchman, was an award-winning documentary filmmaker. When his brother died in 2017 at the age of 62, he was working on a documentary Testimony about their father's testimony at a war-crimes trial.

Although he has been in the stock market business for 34 years, Tuchman says he has never owned stock and if he had to worry about his own profit and loss, he would not be able to concentrate on his customers' well-being.

In March 2020, Tuchman contracted the novel coronavirus. Earlier, two people on the New York Stock Exchange tested positive for the virus.

References

1958 births
Living people
American stockbrokers
American stock traders
20th-century American Jews
21st-century American Jews